Ceratostoma burnetti is a species of sea snail, a marine gastropod mollusk in the family Muricidae, the murex snails or rock snails.

Distribution
This marine species occurs off South Korea.

References

/*  Liu, J.Y. [Ruiyu] (ed.). (2008). Checklist of marine biota of China seas. China Science Press. 1267 pp

External links
 Reeve, L. A. (1845-1849). Monograph of the genus Murex. In: Conchologia Iconica: or, illustrations of the shells of molluscous animals, vol. 3, pls 1-37 and unpaginated text. L. Reeve & Co., London.
 Adams, A. (1854). Descriptions of new shells from the collection of Hugh Cuming, Esq. Proceedings of the Zoological Society of London. (1853) 21: 69-74.

Muricidae
Gastropods described in 1849